Johnny Betancourt (Caracas) is a Venezuelan amateur boxer best known to win a silver medal in the light flyweight division at the 2007 PanAm Games . In the final he lost to southpaw Luis Yáñez from the United States.

References

External links
Panam games

Living people
Year of birth missing (living people)
Venezuelan male boxers
Light-flyweight boxers
Boxers at the 2007 Pan American Games
Pan American Games silver medalists for Venezuela
Pan American Games medalists in boxing
Medalists at the 2007 Pan American Games
21st-century Venezuelan people